The girls' doubles tournament of the 2019 Badminton Asia Junior Championships will be held from 24 to 28 July. Febriana Dwipuji Kusuma / Ribka Sugiarto from Indonesia clinched this title in the last edition.

Seeds
Seeds were announced on 2 July.

 Nita Violina Marwah / Putri Syaikah (second round)
 Li Yijing / Luo Xumin (champions)
 Febriana Dwipuji Kusuma / Amalia Cahaya Pratiwi (second round)
 Lin Fangling / Zhou Xinru (semifinals)

Draw

Finals

Top half

Section 1

Section 2

Bottom half

Section 3

Section 4

References

External links 
Main Draw

2019 Badminton Asia Junior Championships